Act II: The Father of Death is the second album by indie rock band The Protomen, and the follow-up to the band's self-titled debut. The album also revisits the Mega Man-inspired rock opera concept from the band's first album, and functions as a prequel to the first release, focusing on the relationship between Thomas Light and Albert Wily before Wily's takeover of the city that functions as the story's primary setting.

On September 1, 2009, the album's track list, cover art, and full title were revealed (previously, the band had referred to the album simply as Act II). The album was released a week later, on September 8, 2009. The group has stated that they were largely influenced by the 1984 movie Streets of Fire.

Plot summary
Doctor Thomas Light, the son of a miner who "worked into his grave" to provide for his family, partners with Doctor Albert Wily to create an army of labor robots to perform dangerous work for humans. However, on the day that the first of the machines are to be activated, Light begins to have second thoughts, concerned with the number of workers who will be displaced by his and Wily's creations ("The Good Doctor").

Wily convinces Light that they have come too far to back out now, and Light hesitantly flips the switch to activate the machines. As the machines come to life, Light leaves his and Wily's workshop, plagued by his doubts towards both the future of the city and his partner's intentions, and heads to his home to meet with his lover, Emily Stanton; however, Wily arrives there first, along with one of the robots.

After Emily refuses Wily's offer to come away with him ("Father of Death"), Wily orders the robot to kill her. Light arrives at the scene just in time to see the robot slip out the window, leaving behind the knife it used to murder Light's beloved. At that moment, the police arrive, and they open fire on Light as he escapes out the window, assuming him to have murdered the girl.

Meanwhile, Wily holds a press conference, implicating his former partner in Emily's murder and riling up the citizens of the city ("The Hounds"), assuring them that the "dangerous murderer" will not go unpunished. Light is eventually apprehended several days later at the scene of Emily's funeral and is put on trial ("The State Vs. Thomas Light"). He barely escapes the death penalty, but is a pariah afterwards, forced to leave the city by train in the face of the bloodthirsty crowd of citizens who believe Wily's lies ("Give Us the Rope").

With his former partner now ostracized, Wily is free to enact his plans without resistance. As the years pass, the citizens of the city slowly begin to depend more and more on the robots who have become a part of their everyday life, turning the city into a technological marvel ("How the World Fell Under Darkness").

Years later, a generation has been born, one which lives a life of leisure, never knowing the world their parents had lived in before Wily's robots; still, there are rumors of a red-eyed demon which patrols the dark streets of the city, one which will make you disappear for good if you are overheard speaking against Wily or his new world.

A young man named Joe, tired with what the city has become, attempts to escape ("Breaking Out") and is hunted down by the demon, in actuality the robot which killed Emily years earlier.

In the outskirts of the city, Joe realizes that he is being followed ("Keep Quiet"); he engages the machine in a fight and, after managing to shoot the robot with its own weapon, holds it off long enough for an aged, grey-haired Doctor Light to appear and kill it. After introducing himself to the youth, Light removes the robot's green helmet, giving it to Joe to wear.

As they talk, Light and Joe begin to make plans to take down Wily and free the city from his reign ("Light Up the Night"): Joe will break into and scale Wily's tower in order to destroy his main transmitter, allowing Light to slip into the city and kill Wily while his 'eyes' are down. The pair make their move, and Joe manages to execute the first part of his plan perfectly, crashing through the doors of Wily's compound with his motorcycle and setting the bomb that he will detonate to destroy the transmitter at the top of the tower ("The Fall").

However, the bomb detonates prematurely, killing Joe in the blast; Light watches helplessly as Joe's body is blown off the tower, falling to the street below. Light realizes too late that there is a second transmitter, Wily having anticipated an eventual attack, and that he has played right into his former partner's hands; declaring that the city is under attack by 'insurgent forces', Wily releases an army of robots of the type that killed Emily and declares the city under martial law. Joe and Light's attack was the last step he needed to take over the city completely.

Light, despondent, at first intends to surrender himself to the oncoming army ("Here Comes the Arm"). He finally reads Emily's last letter to him, which she wrote the night she died and until now he had been unable to bring himself to read.

Reading his beloved's words, Light finds himself inspired to hold off his impending suicide attempt. He calls on Joe, telling him that when he sees Emily to tell her to wait for him, because he "still has work to do". Removing the helmet from the dead youth's head, Light slips away as the robot army approaches.

Legacy
On August 24, 2015, Harmonix announced via Twitter that the band's hit song, "Light Up the Night" would be included in the music video game, Rock Band 4.

The album featured heavily during the first season of the web series Video Game High School. The songs "Breaking Out", "Keep Quiet", and "Light Up the Night" featured during the 4th episode while "The Fall" was the last track during the finale of the series. In addition, the band's song "Not Your Lionheart" was featured in the season 3 finale of the show.

"Light Up the Night" was used in the first trailer of the video game The Wolf Among Us 2.

Track listing
All tracks written and composed by The Protomen.

References

The Protomen albums
Rock operas
2009 albums
Albums produced by Alan Shacklock
Sequel albums